Aminata Dramane Traoré (born 1947) is a Malian author, politician, and political activist. She served as the Minister of Culture and Tourism of Mali from 1997 to 2000 and also worked as coordinator of the United Nations Development Programme. She is the current Coordinator of Forum pour l'autre Mali and Associate Coordinator of the International Network for Cultural Diversity and was elected to the board of the International Press Service in July 2005. She is a member of the scientific committee of the Fundacion IDEAS, Spain's Socialist Party's think tank.

Views
Traoré is a prominent critic of globalization and the economic policies of the most developed nations. Specifically, she has voiced opposition to the Western countries' subsidization of their own cotton farmers, which leaves West African countries at a disadvantage in competing for space in Western markets. Traoré is one of the signatories, or members of the Group of Nineteen, of the Porto Alegre Manifesto issued at the 2005 World Social Forum.

She defended Ahmed Sékou Touré, the long-time president of neighbouring Guinea, saying his bad reputation as a dictator and his attempts at exterminating the Fulas from the Fouta Djalon in Guinea were due to propaganda and misinformation.

Published works
 1999 L'étau. L'Afrique dans un monde sans frontières. Babel Actes Sud.
 2002 Le Viol de l'Imaginaire. Fayard/Actes Sud.
 2005 Lettre au Président des Français à propos de la Côte d'Ivoire et de l'Afrique en général. Fayard.
 2008 L'Afrique humiliée. Fayard.
 2012 L'Afrique mutilée. Taama Editions.

Awards
 2004  - Prince Claus Cultural Award (Netherlands) 
 1995 - Ciwara Prize of Excellence
 1996 - Knight of the National Order of Mali
 2006 - Official of the National Order of Mali
 2008 - Commentator of the National Order of Mali

References

External links
 Aminata Dramane Traoré. Une révoltée altermondialiste 21 mai 2008, Bamako Mali. (interview) Sadou Yattara and Anne Perrin. Rapport Afrique de l’Ouest 2007–2008, OECD. December 2008.
 Aminata Traoré Interview Politis.fr 
 Prince Claus Award 2004 summary

1947 births
Living people
Government ministers of Mali
Malian women writers
People from Bamako
Traoré clan members
20th-century Malian women politicians
20th-century Malian politicians
20th-century women writers
20th-century writers
21st-century women writers
Women government ministers of Mali
21st-century Malian people
21st-century Malian women politicians
21st-century Malian politicians